From ca. 970 until 1018, a series of conflicts between the Bulgarian Empire and the Byzantine Empire led to the gradual reconquest of Bulgaria by the Byzantines, who thus re-established their control over the entire Balkan peninsula for the first time since the 7th-century Slavic invasions. The struggle began with the incorporation of eastern Bulgaria after the Russo-Byzantine War (970–971). Bulgarian resistance was led by the Cometopuli brothers, who – based in the unconquered western regions of the Bulgarian Empire – led it until its fall under Byzantine rule in 1018.

As the Byzantine-Bulgarian relations deteriorated by the end of the 960s, the Eastern Roman Empire paid the Kievan prince Sviatoslav to attack Bulgaria. The unexpected collapse of Bulgaria and Sviatoslav's ambitions to seize Constantinople caught the Eastern Roman Empire off-guard but they managed to pull back the Kievan armies and occupied eastern Bulgaria including the capital Preslav in 971. Emperor Boris II was captured and taken to Constantinople where he abdicated and the Byzantine Emperor John I Tzimiskes announced the annexation of Bulgaria, even though the Eastern Roman Empire only controlled Eastern Bulgaria at the time, and the lands to the west remained under Bulgarian control. The four brothers David, Moses, Aron, and Samuel of the Cometopuli dynasty ruled in the free territories and in 976, launched a major offensive against the Byzantines to regain the lost lands. Soon, the youngest brother, Samuel, took complete authority following the deaths of his three eldest brothers.

Samuel proved to be a successful general inflicting a major defeat on the Byzantine army, commanded by Basil II at the Gates of Trajan and retaking north-eastern Bulgaria. His successful campaigns expanded the Bulgarian borders into Thessaly and Epirus and in 998, he conquered the principality of Duklja. In 997, Samuel was proclaimed Emperor of Bulgaria after the death of the legitimate ruler, Roman.

By the end of the millennium, the fortunes of war turned into Byzantine favour. The Byzantines under Basil II, a successful general and experienced soldier, slowly gained the upper hand and from 1001, started to seize a number of important areas and towns. The Bulgarians were unable to stop the annual Byzantine campaigns which devastated the country. In 1014, the Byzantines won the decisive Battle of Kleidion and Samuel died a few weeks later. Tsar Samuel's reign was followed by the short reigns of his son Gavril Radomir and his nephew Ivan Vladislav. In 1018, Ivan Vladislav's widow, Maria, negotiated very favorable terms of surrender to the Byzantine emperor. All local lords who surrendered were transferred either to Constantinople or to Anatolia and most of them were later assimilated into the Byzantine society. Bulgaria lost its independence and remained subject to Byzantium for more than a century and a half, until 1185. Its western part was transformed into one of the many Byzantine's provinces, which was ruled by a governor appointed by the Emperor. With the collapse of the first Bulgarian state, the Bulgarian church fell under the domination of Greek ecclesiastics who took control of the see of Ohrid and attempted to replace the Bulgarian Slavic liturgy with a Greek liturgy.

Background

During the reign of the Bulgarian emperor Peter I (927–969), the Magyars who had been temporarily contained by his father Simeon I started raiding the Bulgarian lands from 934 and Peter I's efforts to cope with them remained futile. On several occasions the Magyars reached Byzantine Thrace and looted it which was followed by Byzantine accusations that the Bulgarians were doing that on purpose and as a result the relations between the two countries quickly deteriorated. With no means to counter the Magyar threat, Peter I had to conclude an agreement with them in 965 according to which the Bulgarians had to give the Magyars free conduct through their lands to the Byzantine Empire and refuse any assistance to the Byzantine Emperor. The Byzantines responded in the spring of the following year and refused to pay the annual tribute to Bulgaria. Their emperor Nikephoros II Phokas (963–969) who had achieved decisive victories over the Arabs to the east insulted the Bulgarian ambassadors and launched a campaign but upon approaching the Bulgarian border he decided "not to lead his troops in those dangerous places and to give them to the Bulgarians to slaughter them as cattle." Soon after that military demonstration Phokas tried to restore the peace on condition that the Bulgarians would cancel their agreement with the Magyars which was refused by Peter I who reminded the Byzantine emperor that when Bulgaria needed help against the Magyars the Byzantines did not react and now that it had been forced to make peace with them it would be folly to break the treaty.

In that situation Nikephoros II Phokas turned to the usual means of Byzantine diplomacy and decided to pay the Kievan prince Sviatoslav to attack Bulgaria. The noble Kalokyros to whom the mission was entrusted was successful and the spring of 968 the Rus' armies invaded Dobruja. Sviatoslav defeated the Bulgarian army and seized more than 80 fortresses which caused concern among the Byzantines who once again offered peace to Peter I but in the meantime Sviatoslav had to stop his campaign and return to his capital Kiev which was besieged by the Pechenegs. In 969 he returned to Bulgaria and soon after that Peter I suffered an epileptic stroke, abdicated and died on 30 January 970 as a monk. He was succeeded by his eldest son Boris II who had little choice but to cooperate with Sviatoslav, whose attention had by that time been diverted by Kalokyros to Constantinople. The new Byzantine emperor John Tzimiskes (969–976) scored a decisive victory over the Rus' and their Bulgarian allies in the battle of Arcadiopolis (970) and on 5 April 971 seized the Bulgarian capital Preslav where Boris II was captured along with his whole family. He was treated well and John Tzimiskes pretended to have come to liberate the Bulgarians from the Rus'. However, when Sviatoslav was finally defeated, Boris II was taken to Constantinople where he had to abdicate. He had to surrender the imperial insignia – the golden crown and the red boots – which were placed in the cathedral Hagia Sophia. In return he received the title magister. His brother Roman was castrated because the Byzantines needed to assure that the Krum dynasty would die away.

For John Tzimiskes that was a great triumph. The three-century old Byzantine dream to eliminate the Bulgarian state and restore the imperial borders along the Danube seemed to have come true. The annexation of Bulgaria was officially proclaimed, the political heart of the country in north-eastern Bulgaria along with Preslav, the old capital Pliska and the seat of the Bulgarian Patriarchate Drastar (Silistra) were occupied.

Rise of the Cometopuli brothers
While the eastern parts of the empire were conquered and turned into a Byzantine province the lands to the west of Iskar river remained under Bulgarian control and included most of Macedonia, Albania and the lands to the south of the Danube between the Kolubara river (including Srem) to the west and the mountains around Etropole and Ihtiman to the east. These territories were ruled by the four brothers David, Moses, Aron and Samuel, sons of the governor (komita/comes) of Serdica (Sofia) Nikola. Information for the period between 971 and 976 in primary sources is very scarce.

Basil II

In 986, after securing his own position in Byzantium, emperor Basil II gathered a 30,000-man army, marched on the Bulgarian city of Sofia and laid siege to it. Basil began to worry about the wavering loyalty of his nobility and marched his army back towards Byzantine Thrace but was ambushed and defeated at the Battle of the Gates of Trajan. Basil learned from his mistake and his next invasion of Bulgaria would be conducted in a very different manner.

By 1000, Basil had fought off his own nobility and defeated the Islamic threat from the east, and so led another invasion of Bulgaria. This time instead of marching into the middle of the country, he annexed it bit by bit. Eventually, after denying Bulgaria of about a third of its land, the Bulgarians risked everything in one battle in 1014. The Battle of Kleidion was a disaster for the Bulgarians and the Byzantine army captured 15,000 prisoners; 99 out of every 100 was blinded and the 100th was spared one eye to guide the rest back to their homes. The Bulgarians resisted until 1018 when they finally submitted to Basil II's rule.

Once opposition had ceased Basil showed considerable statesmanship in his dealings with the Bulgarians. He wisely accepted Bulgarian taxes in kind rather than in coinage, as a full monetary economy was not established in Bulgaria. Many of the Bulgarian elite were integrated into Byzantine society, being given military or civil positions within the Byzantine state. This integration is illustrated by the last Bulgarian tsar Ivan Vladislav being an ancestor of the Byzantine emperor John II Komnenos.

Notes

Sources
 
 
 
 
 
 
 
 
 
 
 
 
 
 

10th-century conflicts
11th-century conflicts
10th century in Bulgaria
11th century in Bulgaria
10th century in the Byzantine Empire
11th century in the Byzantine Empire
Byzantine–Bulgarian Wars
Rus'–Byzantine wars
Basil II
960s in the Byzantine Empire
970s in the Byzantine Empire
980s in the Byzantine Empire
990s in the Byzantine Empire
1000s in the Byzantine Empire
1010s in the Byzantine Empire
Wars involving the First Bulgarian Empire
Wars involving Bulgaria
968
1018 in Europe
1018 endings
968 beginnings